Central Administrative Okrug, or Tsentralny Administrativny Okrug (Tsentralny administrativny okrug), is one of the twelve administrative okrugs of Moscow, Russia. Population:   It is the core of the city that includes its oldest, historical parts: Kremlin and the former Bely Gorod and Zemlyanoy Gorod; with certain churches and fortifications as old as from XIV-XV centuries. It is also the site of Russia's highest government institutions, such as the Government house, the State Duma, the Federation Council, and most ministries. A large part of the territory is occupied by office buildings, especially in the “Moscow-City” business district on the west side of the Okrug.

Territorial organisation

The okrug, governed by the prefecture, encompasses ten districts. The territory of Kitai-gorod is not a part of any district and is governed by the administrative okrug directly. As other okrugs, it was formally established in 1991. Its OKATO number is 45 286 000 000.

Coat of arms

The Kremlin Hill, from which the colonization of Moscow began, is depicted under Yury Dolgoruky. The purple background symbolizes the supreme power of Russia, concentrated in Central Administrative Okrug. The gold unicorn was a traditional symbol of the Russian Tsars. Below him an ancient Kremlin white-stone wall is featured.

Government and infrastructure

The Interstate Aviation Committee (IAC or MAK), the aviation accident technical investigation body of the Commonwealth of Independent States, has its head office in the Yakimanka District in the okrug. The Federal Penitentiary Service has its head office in Yakimanka District.

The Ministry of Education and Science has its head office in the Tverskoy District.

Economy
Aeroflot has its head office in the Arbat District in the okrug. United Aircraft Corporation has its head office in the Krasnoselsky District in the okrug. Tupolev has its head office in the Basmanny District in the okrug.

The All Nippon Airways Moscow sales office is located in the Presnensky District in the okrug. Korean Air operates its CIS office in the Tverskoy District in the okrug.

Education
The Lycée Français Alexandre Dumas de Moscou, a French international school, is located in the Krasnoselsky District in the okrug.

Sister cities

 Daugavpils, Latvia
 Riga, Latvia
 Ingolstadt, Bavaria, Germany

References

External links

Official website of Central Administrative Okrug 

 
Administrative okrugs of Moscow
Central business districts in Russia